Mississippi Highway 341 (MS 341) is a  north–south state highway in the North Central Hills region of northern Mississippi, connecting Hohenlinden (via Atlanta and Vardaman) with MS 9 near Pontotoc.

Route description

MS 341 begins in Chickasaw County at the Webster County line (located at bridge over Dry Creek), where the road continues south into the community of Hohenlinden as Hohenlinden Road. It travels northeast through farmland for a few miles before climbing up some wooded hills, where it becomes concurrent (overlapped) with MS 340. The highway winds its way north through these wooded hills for a couple miles, where MS 340 splits off along an unmarked dirt road (County Road 407, CR 407), and MS 341 descends into a narrow valley just long enough to pass through the community of Atlanta (where it makes a sharp left turn). MS 341 now climbs some more hills to cross into Calhoun County.

MS 341 descends into another valley and heads north through farmland for several miles, where it crosses the Yalobusha River, before entering the town of Vardaman, immediately having an intersection with MS 8. The highway travels straight through the center of downtown (via a one way pair), then neighborhoods, along Main Street before leaving Vardaman and traveling north through farmland for several more miles to cross a wooded ridge, where it passes through the community of Reid, before crossing the Skuna River and having a short concurrency with MS 32. MS 341 climbs up some more wooded hills before entering Pontotoc County.

MS 341 lowers back down into a valley (the same one as last time) and meanders its way northeast through farmland for several miles, where it makes a sharp left in the community of Buckhorn, before coming to an end at an intersection with MS 9, just a half mile west of the Pontotoc city limits.

The entire length of Mississippi Highway 341 is a rural, two-lane, state highway.

Major intersections

References

External links

341
Transportation in Calhoun County, Mississippi
Transportation in Chickasaw County, Mississippi
Transportation in Pontotoc County, Mississippi